Mathieu Michel (born 4 September 1991) is a French professional footballer who plays as a goalkeeper for Chamois Niortais.

Career
Michel is a youth exponent from Nîmes Olympique. He made his Ligue 2 debut on 23 August 2013 against Tours in a 3–1 away defeat. He played the entire game.

On 16 August 2016, after 17 years at Nîmes Olympique, Michel transferred to Ligue 1 club Angers SCO on a three-year deal.

On 31 August 2018, the last day of the 2018 summer transfer window, he joined Ligue 2 side AJ Auxerre.

Career statistics

Club

Honours
 Coupe de France runner-up: 2017

References

1991 births
Living people
Footballers from Nîmes
Association football goalkeepers
French footballers
Ligue 2 players
Ligue 1 players
Nîmes Olympique players
Angers SCO players
AJ Auxerre players
Chamois Niortais F.C. players